The 1881 Randolph–Macon Yellow Jackets football team represented Randolph–Macon College during the 1881 college football season.

Schedule

References

Randolph–Macon
Randolph–Macon Yellow Jackets football seasons
College football winless seasons
Randolph–Macon Yellow Jackets football